Jayson Gee (born December 13, 1965) is an American men's college basketball coach who most recently served as an assistant coach under John Brannen at Cincinnati. He was formerly head coach at Longwood from 2013–2018. Prior to Longwood, Gee served as head coach of his alma mater Division II Charleston Golden Eagles and the associate head coach at Division I Cleveland State, Division I St. Bonaventure, and Division I Ohio. In 2015, he was awarded the John Lotz Barnabas award by the Fellowship of Christian Athletes.

Head coaching record

References

1965 births
Living people
American men's basketball coaches
Charleston Golden Eagles men's basketball coaches
Charleston Golden Eagles men's basketball players
Cleveland State Vikings men's basketball coaches
College men's basketball head coaches in the United States
Longwood Lancers men's basketball coaches
Ohio Bobcats men's basketball coaches
St. Bonaventure Bonnies men's basketball coaches
Youngstown State Penguins men's basketball coaches
American men's basketball players